Annie Penn Hospital is located in Reidsville, North Carolina. Part of Cone Health, the hospital has 110 licensed acute-care beds and provides a number of specialties, including orthopedic surgery, gastroenterology, gynecology, urology, ophthalmology, general surgery, podiatry, nephrology, otolaryngology, and thoracic and general medicine.

References

External links
 

Hospitals in North Carolina
Buildings and structures in Rockingham County, North Carolina
Cone family
Cone Health